Chapeno is a census-designated place (CDP) in Starr County, Texas, United States. This was a new CDP for the 2010 census with a population of 47.

Geography
Chapeno is located at  (26.550879, -99.133880).

Education
It is in the Roma Independent School District. The zoned elementary school for the 2010 Census community is Emma Vera Elementary School. Roma High School is the district's sole comprehensive high school.

References

Census-designated places in Starr County, Texas
Census-designated places in Texas